The University of Franeker (1585–1811) was a university in Franeker, Friesland, the Netherlands. It was the second oldest university of the Netherlands, founded shortly after Leiden University.

History
Also known as Academia Franekerensis or the University of Friesland, it consisted of departments of Theology, Law, Medicine, Philosophy, Mathematics and Physics. Among its well-known students was Peter Stuyvesant, last director-general of the Dutch colony of New Netherland.

Initially the university had an excellent reputation, attracting students from far and wide, but from 1700 its fortune changed. The university was disbanded by Napoleon in 1811, along with the Universities of Harderwijk and Utrecht. After the end of the French régime, the university was not restored. Instead, an Athenaeum illustre was founded, which did not have the right to issue doctoral degrees. In 1843, the Athenaeum itself was disbanded because of a lack of students.

Notable professors and alumni 
 Jean-Nicolas-Sébastien Allamand (1713-1787), professor of philosophy (1747-1749) then professor of mathematics and philosophy, University of Leiden
 Lieuwe van Aitzema, historian and diplomat
 William Ames, theologian
 Willem Baudartius, theologian
 Balthasar Bekker, theologian
 Court Lambertus van Beyma, delegate of the Frisian States
 Govert Bidloo, anatomist and personal physician of William III of Orange-Nassau, Dutch stadholder and king of England
 Cornelius van Bynkershoek, jurist and legal theorist, president of the Supreme Court of the Netherlands
 Steven Blankaart Dutch physician and entomologist
 Johannes Bogerman, professor for theology, president of the Synod of Dort 
 Sebald Justinus Brugmans, professor of physics and mathematics 1785 
 Petrus Camper, professor of philosophy, anatomy and surgery in 1750 
 Johannes Cocceius, professor for Hebrew and theology, 1643
 René Descartes (1596-1650), student (1629-1630)
 Johannes van den Driesche, professor of Oriental languages at Oxford in 1575 and in Franeker in 1585
 Nathaniel Eaton (1632), first professor of Harvard College in 1638 
 Sicco van Goslinga, Dutch statesman and diplomat
 Willem van Haren, poet and politician
 Onno Zwier van Haren, writer and politician
 Daniel Heinsius, student and later professor in Leiden
 Tiberius Hemsterhuis, professor of Greek and history, 1720–1740
 Ulrik Huber, professor of law and a political philosopher
 Theodorus van Kooten, professor of Latin language and history, poet and politician 
 Johann Samuel König, professor for mathematics and philosophy, 1744–1749
  Joannes Antonides van der Linden, physician and medical bibliographer, 1639-1651
 Sibrandus Lubbertus, professor of theology 1585-1625
 Johannes Maccovius, professor of theology in 1615, brother in law of Saskia van Uylenburgh
 Henricus Antonides Nerdenus, professor of theology 1585-1614
 Adriaan Metius, mathematician and astronomer, professor extraordinarius in 1598
 Johannes Mulder, (1769–1810) student and later professor at the University of Groningen
 Mattheus Brouërius van Nidek poet
 Jacob Perizonius,  professor eloquence and history 1682-1693
 Murk van Phelsum, physician 
 Herman Alexander Röell, professor of theology 
 Petrus Stuyvesant (1612-1672), governor of New Amsterdam
 Jean Henri van Swinden, professor of physics and philosophy in 1766
 Christiaan Hendrik Trotz, professor of law 1741
 Johan Valckenaer, lawyer, patriot and diplomat
 Lodewijk Caspar Valckenaer, professor of Greek 1741-1765 
 Johannes Henricus Voorda, professor of law 1797-1802
 William IV, Prince of Orange (1711-1751), stadtholder of the Netherlands
 Eise Eisinga (1724-1828) amateur astronomer who built the Eise Eisinga Planetarium in his house in Franeker, later became professor of astronomy

See also 
 List of early modern universities in Europe

References

External links 
 NRC newspaper article on the University of Franeker by Peter van Rooden (in Dutch)
  History of the University of Franker maintained by the Euler-Franeker Memorial University.
 Alumni of the University of Franeker1586-1636. National Library of the Netherlands.

 
Franeker, University of
1585 establishments in the Dutch Republic
1811 disestablishments in the Netherlands
Franeker, University of
Education in the Dutch Republic
Franeker